Central Elementary Public School District 32 was a school district headquartered in Amidon, North Dakota.

Within Slope County, it operated Amidon Elementary School, a one room schoolhouse. In 2005 it had four students.

History
In 2005 the school community opposed a bill that would promote consolidation into a high school district.

In August 2018, two parents indicated they would not send their children to the school due to disagreements involving a teacher there. The board decided to dissolve the district. 

The district was scheduled to dissolve on July 1, 2020. It was to be divided between Bowman County School District No. 1 and New England School District No. 9.

Campus
The school had two main rooms and an art/music/lunch area in the basement. In 2005 it had four computers.

Operations
For the high school level the district did not operate classes but instead paid tuition for students, who each selected an area high school of their choice.

In 2005 the annual cost of the building itself was $101,516 while other expenses, including high school tuition and special needs costs, amounted to $91,741.

See also
 Sheets Public School District 14 (Cottage School), another one room schoolhouse and at the time one of two schools in Slope County (it closed in 2005)

References

Slope County, North Dakota
Former school districts in North Dakota
2020 disestablishments in North Dakota
One-room schoolhouses in North Dakota
School districts disestablished in 2020